Marcella Biondi (born 3 June 1970) is a retired Italian alpine skier and freestyle skier.

Between 1986 and 1989 she competed internationally in the "acro" event of freestyle skiing, i.e. ski ballet, with a 24th place at the 1989 World Championships and sixteen top-20 placements in the FIS Freestyle Ski World Cup.

She made her FIS Alpine Ski World Cup debut in March 1992 in Crans-Montana, collecting her first World Cup points with a 26th place. Between January 1993 and February 1995 she managed four more World Cup placements in the top 30. The last, a 28th place in February 1995 in Maribor, was also her last World Cup outing.

References 

1970 births
Living people
Sportspeople from Aosta Valley
Italian female alpine skiers
Italian female freestyle skiers